The Hushan mine is a large mine located in the south-eastern China in Zhejiang. Hushan represents one of the largest fluorite reserves in China having estimated reserves of 4.5 million tonnes of ore grading 50% fluorite.

References 

Fluorite mines in China